Chronicles is a 2006 greatest hits album by Free.

Track listing

2006 greatest hits albums
Free (band) compilation albums
Island Records compilation albums